Nicolás Enrique Alberto Gutiérrez Contreras (born 28 January 2000) is a Chilean footballer who plays for Lautaro de Buin as a forward.

International career
At early age, he represented Chile at under-15 level at the 2015 South American U-15 Championship and Chile U17 at the 2017 South American U-17 Championship.

Honours
Palestino
Copa Chile: 2018

References

External links

Nicolás Gutiérrez at playmakerstats.com (English version of ceroacero.es)

2000 births
Living people
Chilean footballers
Chile youth international footballers
Chilean Primera División players
Segunda División Profesional de Chile players
Club Deportivo Palestino footballers
Lautaro de Buin footballers
Association football midfielders
Place of birth missing (living people)